Vision of Lear is the first opera by Toshio Hosokawa which premiered at the Munich Biennale in 1998. The opera in two acts is an adaptation of Shakespeare's King Lear, including elements from the traditional Japanese Noh theatre. The libretto was written in English by Tadashi Suzuki.

History 
Toshio Hosokawa composed his first opera in 1997 and 1998 on a commission of the City of Munich for its 1998 Munich Biennale. The libretto was written in English by Tadashi Suzuki, based on Shakespeare's play King Lear. The opera in two acts includes elements from the traditional Japanese Noh theatre.

The world premiere at the Carl-Orff-Saal of the Gasteig on 19 April 1998, as part of the festival, was staged by Suzuki who was also responsible for stage, costume, and lighting design. It was performed by the Xsemble Munich, conducted by Georges-Elie Octors, in a co-production of the Biennale and the Shizuoka Performing Arts Center. The UK premiere was given in the Linbury Studio of the Royal Opera House on 31 January 2002, staged by director Harry Ross and designer Mike Jardine, and conducted by Gregory Rose, with Nicholas Garrett in the title role.

Roles

Supporting roles are: Servant/Captain/Gentleman, sung by one tenor, two nurses, played by actors, and an optional children's choir or female choir.

Plot 
The Lear story is framed by a situation in which a nurse reads from Shakespeare's play to an old man. His memories of his life, and the events in the drama connect. He has visions of bringing Goneril and Regan to court, and speaks in Lear's words to imagined figures from the drama. His life ends with a vision of Lear dying with Cordelia's corpse in his arms. The nurse keeps reading.

References

External links 
 H. E. Elsom: All is dull and deadly (review of UK premiere) concertonet.com 2002

Operas
1998 operas
English-language operas
Operas based on King Lear